Thug Brothers is a collaborative studio album by American rappers Layzie Bone of Bone Thugs-n-Harmony and Young Noble of the Outlawz. It was released on February 7, 2006 via Real Talk Entertainment. A sequel album Thug Brothers 2 was released in 2017 which is a collaborative effort by Krayzie Bone and Young Noble, Krazie Bone picks up where Layzie Bone left off.

Track listing

Charts

References

External links

2006 albums
Layzie Bone albums
Young Noble albums
Collaborative albums
Albums produced by Big Hollis
Real Talk Entertainment albums
Gangsta rap albums by American artists